The Appointments of Dennis Jennings is a 1988 American short comedy film, starring, co-written and co-produced by Steven Wright, which won the Oscar for Best Live Action Short Film at the 61st Academy Awards in 1988.

Plot
Dennis Jennings (Steven Wright) is an introvert, showing symptoms of obsessive-compulsive disorder, anxiety, paranoia, and a troubled youth. He works as a waiter and has an indifferent girlfriend, Emma, who only seems to patronize him. The "appointments" are with his psychiatrist (Rowan Atkinson), who is annoyed with him and uninterested in what he has to say. After finding his doctor sharing Dennis's intimate secrets with a group of fellow psychiatrists at a bar, and then finding that his girlfriend is cheating on him with the doctor, Dennis decides he has had enough. He hunts the doctor, shoots him, and goes to jail afterwards.

Cast

References

External links 
 Homepage
 
 The Appointments of Dennis Jennings on YouTube

1988 films
Live Action Short Film Academy Award winners
Films directed by Dean Parisot
1988 short films
American comedy short films
1980s English-language films